Rachel Hood (born October 12, 1976) is an American politician from Michigan. Hood is a Democratic member of Michigan House of Representatives from District 76.

Early life 
On October 12, 1976, Hood was born in Grand Rapids, Michigan.

Education 
In 1999, Hood earned a Bachelor of Science degree in Social Relations from Michigan State University. Hood earned a degree in Public Policy from Michigan State University's James Madison College.

Career 
In 2000, Hood started her career as an executive director of West Grand Neighborhood Association, where she was involved in crime prevention and community development. In 2005, Hood was a Community Relations Manager at Metro Health Hospital in Wyoming, Michigan. Hood is a co-founder of Local First and City Built Brewing Company. Hood is a former strategist consultant at Dig Deep Research. In the 2016 elections in Kent County, Hood ran for Drain Commissioner but lost the election in a close race.

On November 6, 2018, Hood won the election and became a Democratic member of Michigan House of Representatives for District 76. Hood defeated Amanda Brand.

Personal life 
Hood's husband is Dave. They have two children. Hood and her family live in Grand Rapids, Michigan.

See also 
 2018 Michigan House of Representatives election

References

External links 
 Rachel Hood at ballotpedia.org

1979 births
21st-century American politicians
Living people
Democratic Party members of the Michigan House of Representatives
Politicians from Grand Rapids, Michigan
Women state legislators in Michigan
Michigan State University alumni
21st-century American women politicians